The football competition at the 1964 Summer Olympics started on 11 October and ended on 23 October. Only one event, the men's tournament, was contested. The tournament features 14 men's national teams from six continental confederations. The 14 teams are drawn into two groups of four and two groups of three and each group plays a round-robin tournament. At the end of the group stage, the top two teams advanced to the knockout stage, beginning with the quarter-finals and culminating with the gold medal match at the Olympic Stadium on 23 October 1964. There was also three consolation matches played by losing quarter-finalists. The winner of these matches placed fifth in the tournament.

Qualification 

Regional qualifying tournaments were held. A riot in Lima during the decisive Peru–Argentina match resulted in 328 deaths.

16 teams qualified, and were divided into four groups:
Group A (United Team of Germany (which was de facto East Germany), Romania, Mexico, Iran)
Group B (Hungary, Yugoslavia, Morocco, Korea D.P.R.)
Group C (Czechoslovakia, United Arab Republic (Egypt), Brazil, Korea Rep.)
Group D (Japan, Ghana, Argentina, Italy)
The two best teams of each group competed in the quarter-finals.

Ultimately, the tournament was played two teams short: 
Italy were disqualified as their team was not amateur; Poland, who Italy had beaten to qualify, declined to take Italy's place due to a lack of preparation time. 
 North Korea withdrew from the entire Games before the Opening Ceremony after Japanese immigration officials refused six of their athletes entry.

Venues

Medalists 

Note: Only players from the East Germany represented the joint Olympic team of United Team of Germany.

Squads

First round

Group A

Group B

Group C

Group D

Quarter-finals

Semi-finals

Bronze Medal match

Gold Medal match

First consolation round 
Played by losing quarter-finalists.

Consolation Final (5th place match)

Brackets

Goalscorers 
With 12 goals, Ferenc Bene of Hungary is the top scorer in the tournament. In total, 123 goals were scored by 56 different players, with only one of them credited as own goal.

12 goals
  Ferenc Bene
8 goals
  Ibrahim Riad
6 goals
  Tibor Csernai
  Cornel Pavlovici
5 goals
  Ivan Mráz
  Slaven Zambata
4 goals
  Josef Vojta
  Henning Frenzel
  Rudolf Belin
  Ivica Osim
3 goals
  Jan Brumovský
  Eberhard Vogel
  Hamoud Fulaiteh
  Rifaat El-Fanagily
2 goals

  Juan Carlos Domínguez
  Elizeu Antônio Ferreira Vinagre Godoy
  Roberto Miranda
  Karel Lichtnégl
  Vojtech Masný
  Jürgen Nöldner
  Imre Komora
  Ryuichi Sugiyama
  Carol Creiniceanu
  Ion Pârcălab
  Badawi Abdel Fattah

1 goal

  Carlos Alberto Bulla
  Zé Roberto
  Anton Urban
  František Valošek
  Ľudovít Cvetler
  Bernd Bauchspieß
  Hermann Stöcker
  Wolfgang Barthels
  Edward Acquah
  Gyau Agyemang
  Sam Acquah
  Wilberforce Mfum
  János Farkas
  Karam Ali Nirlou
  Aritatsu Ogi
  Kunishige Kamamoto
  Saburo Kawabuchi
  Shigeo Yaegashi
  Javier Fragoso
  José Luis González Dávila
  Ali Bouachra
  Ion Ionescu
  Gheorghe Constantin
  Lee Yi-Woo
  Aly Etman
  Kalil Shanin
  Mahmoud Hassan
  Raafat Attia
  Seddik Mohamed
  Spasoje Samardžić

Own goal
  Vladimír Weiss (playing against Hungary)

Final ranking

References

External links 

 Olympic Football Tournament Tokyo 1964, FIFA.com
 RSSSF Summary
 Hungarian medalists - Tokyo 1964

 
1964 Summer Olympics events
1964
Olympic
1964
Olympic
Olympic
Olympic
Olympic
Olympic
Olympic
Olympic
Olympic
Olympic